Peters' gecko (Gonatodes petersi) is a species of lizard in the family Sphaerodactylidae. The species is endemic to Venezuela.

Etymology
The specific name, petersi, is in honor of American herpetologist James A. Peters.

Geographic range
G. petersi is found on the eastern slopes of the Sierra de Perijá in Zulia state, Venezuela.

Habitat

Behavior
G. petersi is mainly diurnal.

Reproduction
G. petersi is oviparous.

References

Further reading
Barrio-Amorós CL, Ortíz JC (2016). "Venezuelan geckos (Gekkonidae, Phyllodactylidae, Sphaerodactylidae) in the collection of the Universidad de Concepción in Chile, with description of the type series of Gonatodes ligiae and Gonatodes petersi (Sphaerodactylidae)". Zootaxa 4136 (3): 537–552.
Donoso-Barros R (1967). "Diagnosis de dos nuevas especies del género Gonatodes de Venezuela ". Noticiario Mensual del Museo Nacional de Historia Natural, Santiago de Chile 11 (129): 4–8. (Gonatodes petersi, new species). (in Spanish).
Rojas-Runjaic FJM, Infante Rivero EE (2009). "Redescripción de Gonatodes petersi Donoso-Barros, 1967 (Squamata: Gekkonidae), un tuqueque endémico de la vertiente venezolana de la sierra de Perijá". Memoria de la Fundación La Salle de Ciencias Naturales 170: 81–98. (in Spanish, with an abstract in English).
Rösler H (2000). "Kommentierte Liste der rezent, subrezent und fossil bekannten Geckotaxa (Reptilia: Gekkonomorpha)". Gekkota 2: 28–153. (Gonatodes petersi, p. 84). (in German).

Gonatodes
Reptiles described in 1967